Heads or Tails (Italian: Testa o croce) is a 1969 Italian western film directed by Piero Pierotti and starring John Ericson, Špela Rozin and Edwige Fenech. It was shot at the Tirrenia Studios.

Cast
 John Ericson as Will Hunter 
 Špela Rozin as Shanda Lee 
 Franco Lantieri as Serpente 
 Daniela Surina as Sybille Burton
 Edwige Fenech as Manuela
 Pinuccio Ardia as Miserere 
 Ugo Pagliai as Burton 
 Isarco Ravaioli as Sheriff 
 Dada Gallotti
 Loris Gizzi
 Renato Navarrini
 Maria Teresa Piaggio
 Pasquale Basile
 Silvana Bacci
 Franco Daddi
 Antonietta Fiorito

References

Bibliography 
 Thomas Weisser. Spaghetti Westerns: The Good, the Bad, and the Violent : a Comprehensive, Illustrated Filmography of 558 Eurowesterns and Their Personnel, 1961-1977. McFarland, 1992.

External links 
 

1969 films
Italian Western (genre) films
1969 Western (genre) films
1960s Italian-language films
Films directed by Piero Pierotti
Films scored by Carlo Savina
1960s Italian films